

Events 

 January–June 
 January 4 – The Cortes of Castile approves a new subsidy, the millones.
 March 4 – Maurice of Nassau, Prince of Orange, takes Breda, by concealing 68 of his best men in a peat-boat, to get through the impregnable defences.
 March 14 – Battle of Ivry: Henry IV of France again defeats the forces of the Catholic League, under Charles, Duke of Mayenne.
 May–August – Henry IV of France unsuccessfully attempts to besiege Paris. Henry is forced to raise the siege, when Alexander Farnese, Duke of Parma comes to its rescue with a Spanish army.
 May 17 – Anne of Denmark is crowned queen consort of Scotland, at Holyrood Abbey in Edinburgh.
 May 21 – The Treaty of Constantinople is signed.

 July–December 
 August 18 – John White, governor of the Colony of Roanoke, returns from a supply-trip to England and finds his settlement deserted. After the unsuccessful search, he returns to England on October 24.
 September 5 – Alexander Farnese's army forces Henry IV of France to lift the siege of Paris.
 September 15 – Urban VII succeeds Sixtus V, as the 228th pope; he dies of malaria twelve days later.
 September 15 – The Neulengbach earthquake causes significant damage and some loss of life, in Lower Austria and Vienna; the effects are felt as far as Bohemia and Silesia.
 December 5 – Gregory XIV succeeds Urban VII, as the 229th pope.
 December 7 – North Berwick witch trials: Agnes Sampson is questioned by King James VI of Scotland, and confesses to practising witchcraft.

 Date unknown 
 Orthodox Patriarch Meletius I of Alexandria succeeds Silvester.
 Japan is united by Toyotomi Hideyoshi.
 The Spanish are pushed out of southern Gelderland, by the Dutch forces.

Births

January–June

 January 9 – Simon Vouet, French painter (d. 1649)
 January 13 – Arthur Bell, English Franciscan martyr (d. 1643)
 January 20 – Edward Convers, American settler (d. 1663)
 January 27 – Charles Caesar, English politician and judge (d. 1642)
 January 30 – Lady Anne Clifford, 14th Baroness de Clifford (d. 1676)
 February 7 – Barthold Nihus, Roman Catholic priest (d. 1657)
 March – Roger Ludlow, one of the founders of the colony (later the state) of Connecticut (d. 1664)
 March 6 – Margaret of the Blessed Sacrament, French Discalced Carmelite nun (d. 1660)
 March 10 – Dietrich Reinkingk, German lawyer and politician (d. 1664)
 March 18 – Manuel de Faria e Sousa, Spanish and Portuguese historian and poet (d. 1649)
 March 29 – Michael Reyniersz Pauw, Dutch businessman (d. 1640)
 April 7
 Louis de Dieu, Dutch theologian (d. 1642)
 John Upton, English politician (d. 1641)
 April 18 – Ahmed I, Ottoman Sultan (d. 1617)
 May – William Cecil, 17th Baron de Ros (d. 1618)
 May 3 – Franco Burgersdijk, Dutch logician (d. 1635)
 May 5
 John Albert II, Duke of Mecklenburg (d. 1636)
 Jakub Sobieski, Polish noble (d. 1646)
 May 12 – Cosimo II de' Medici, Grand Duke of Tuscany (d. 1621)
 May 31 – Frances Carr, Countess of Somerset (d. 1632)
 June 1 – Isaac Manasses de Pas, Marquis de Feuquieres, French soldier (d. 1640)
 June 9 – Caspar Sibelius, Dutch Protestant minister (d. 1658)
 June 19 – Philip Bell, British colonial governor (d. 1678)
 June 24 – Samuel Ampzing, Dutch linguist and historian (d. 1632)
 June 29 – Edward Rodney, English politician (d. 1657)

July–December

 July 3 – Lucrezia Orsina Vizzana, Italian singer and composer (d. 1662)
 July 13 – Pope Clement X (d. 1676)
 July 26 – Johannes Crellius, Polish–German theologian (d. 1633)
 August 6 – Count John Louis of Nassau-Hadamar (d. 1653)
 August 7 – Charles of Austria, Bishop of Wroclaw (d. 1624)
 August 9 – John Webster, colonial settler and governor of Connecticut (d. 1661)
 August 19 – Henry Rich, 1st Earl of Holland, English soldier (d. 1649)
 August 27 – Ferruccio Baffa Trasci, Italian bishop (d. 1656)
 August 30 – Anthony Stapley, English politician (d. 1655)
 September 12 – María de Zayas, Spanish writer (d. 1661)
 September 15 – Erasmus Earle, English barrister and politician (d. 1667)
 October 3 – Anna of Pomerania, Duchess-Consort of Croy and Havré (d. 1660)
 October 11 – William Pynchon, English colonist and fur trader in North America (d. 1662)
 November 25 – Juan Alonso de Cuevas y Davalos, Roman Catholic prelate, Archbishop of Mexico and Antequera (d. 1665)
 December 3 – Daniel Seghers, Flemish Jesuit brother and painter (d. 1661)
 December 14 – John West, colonial governor of Virginia (d. 1659)
 December 18 – William Louis, Count of Nassau-Saarbrücken (d. 1640)
 December 18 – Saratov Russia (d. 1640)

Date unknown
 Angelica Veronica Airola, Italian painter (d. 1670)
 Boris Morozov, Russian statesman and boyar (d. 1661)
 Isaac de Caus, French landscaper (d. 1648)
 Yamada Nagamasa, Japanese adventurer (d. 1630)

Probable
 William Bradford, English leader of Plymouth Colony (d. 1657)
 William Browne, English poet (d. 1645)
 Theophilus Eaton, Puritan colonial merchant (d. 1658)
 Kösem Sultan (d. 1651)
 Mícheál Ó Cléirigh, Irish chronicler (d. 1643)
 Marie Vernier, French actress (d. 1627)
 Caterina Assandra, Italian composer (died c. 1618)
 Magdalena Andersdotter, Norwegian-Faroese shipowner (d. 1650)
 Teofila Chmielecka, Polish military role model (d. 1650)
 Marie Fouquet, French medical writer and philanthropist (d. 1681)

Deaths 

 January 7 – Jakob Andreae, German theologian (b. 1528)
 January 20 – Giambattista Benedetti, Italian mathematician and physicist (b. 1530)
 February 1 – Lawrence Humphrey, president of Magdalen College, Oxford (b. 1527)
 February 2 – Catherine of Ricci, Catholic prioress and saint (b. 1522)
 February 4 – Gioseffo Zarlino, Italian music theorist and composer (b. 1517)
 February 12
 François Hotman, French Protestant lawyer and writer (b. 1524)
 Blanche Parry, personal attendant to Elizabeth I of England (b. c. 1508)
 February 18 – Asahi no kata, Japanese lady, Toyotomi Hideyoshi's half-sister (b. 1543)
 February 19 – Philipp IV, Count of Hanau-Lichtenberg (b. 1514)
 February 21 – Ambrose Dudley, 3rd Earl of Warwick, English nobleman and general (b. 1528)
 March 4 – Duchess Hedwig of Württemberg, by marriage countess of Hesse-Marburg (b. 1547)
 April 2 – Elisabeth of Saxony, Countess Palatine of Simmern (b. 1552)
 April 6 – Francis Walsingham, English spymaster (b. 1530)
 May 9 – Charles de Bourbon French cardinal and pretender to the throne (b. 1523)
 June 28 – Hori Hidemasa, Japanese warlord (b. 1553)
 June 30 – Maha Thammaracha (b. 1509)
 July 10 – Charles II, Archduke of Austria, regent of Inner Austria (b. 1540)
 July 21 – Sophie of Württemberg, German noble (b. 1563)
 August 10
 Hōjō Ujimasa, Japanese warlord (b. 1538)
 Hōjō Ujiteru, Japanese warlord (b. 1540？)
 August 17 – James III, Margrave of Baden-Hachberg (b. 1562)
 August 27 – Pope Sixtus V (b. 1521)
 September 10 – Archduchess Magdalena of Austria, Member of the House of Habsburg (b. 1532)
 September 13 – Pedro Téllez-Girón, 1st Duke of Osuna, Spanish duke (b. 1537)
 September 20 – Lodovico Agostini, Italian composer (b. 1534)
 September 27 – Pope Urban VII (b. 1521)
 October 4 – Jacques Cujas, French legal expert (b. 1522)
 October 12 – Kanō Eitoku, Japanese painter (b. 1543)
 October 16 – Archduchess Anna of Austria, Duchess of Bavaria (b. 1528)
 October 18 – Philip, Duke of Holstein-Gottorp (b. 1570)
 October 23 – Bernardino de Sahagún, Franciscan missionary (b. 1499)
 October  29 – Dirck Volckertszoon Coornhert, Dutch politician and theologian (b. 1522)
 November 18 – George Talbot, 6th Earl of Shrewsbury, English statesman (b. 1528)
 November 19 – Girolamo Zanchi, Italian theologian (b. 1516)
 November 29 – Philipp Nicodemus Frischlin, German philologist and poet (b. 1547)
 December 20 – Ambroise Paré, French surgeon (b. 1510)
 December 27 – Emanuel Philibert de Lalaing, Belgian noble and army commander (b. 1557)

Date unknown 
 Nicholas Bobadilla, one of the first Spanish Jesuits (b. 1511)
 Marietta Robusti, Venetian Renaissance painter (b. 1555 or 1560)
 Roger Dudley, British soldier (b. 1535)
 Sorley Boy MacDonnell, Irish chieftain (b. 1505)
 Juan Bautista de Pomar, Spanish colonial historian and writer
 Catherine Salvaresso, Wallachian regent
 Maddalena Casulana, Italian composer, lutenist and singer (d. 1544)

Probable 
Bernard Palissy, French potter (b. 1510)

References